Claudia Kohde-Kilsch was the defending champion but lost in the semifinals to Zina Garrison.

Martina Navratilova won in the final 7–6, 6–3 against Garrison.

Seeds
A champion seed is indicated in bold text while text in italics indicates the round in which that seed was eliminated. The top eight seeds received a bye to the second round.

  Martina Navratilova (Champion)
  Zina Garrison (final)
  Pam Shriver (third round)
  Lori McNeil (second round)
  Claudia Kohde-Kilsch (semifinals)
  Larisa Savchenko (third round)
  Anne Minter (third round)
  Terry Phelps (second round)
  Rosalyn Fairbank (third round)
 n/a
  Kathy Rinaldi (third round)
  Elna Reinach (semifinals)
  Sara Gomer (second round)
 n/a
  Ann Henricksson (quarterfinals)
  Jo Durie (third round)

Draw

Finals

Top half

Section 1

Section 2

Bottom half

Section 3

Section 4

References
 1989 Dow Classic Draws
 ITF tournament page
 ITF singles results page

Birmingham Classic (tennis)
1989 WTA Tour